The Royal Wind Music is a Dutch recorder consort.

Founded by Paul Leenhouts in 1997, The Royal Wind Music is a consort of thirteen former students of the Amsterdam Conservatoire. They use a large range of Renaissance recorders by Adriana Breukink and Bob Marvin, from a 15 cm sopranino to a  sub-contrabass.  They have performed throughout Europe and the United States, including the Boston Early Music Festival.  Since 2010 they have performed without a conductor.

With the goal of bringing Renaissance music to life, they perform arrangements of music originally composed for other instruments from the period 1520-1640 and have become one of the leading examples of the recorder orchestra movement.

In 2006 they won the Noorderkerk prize at the Vriendenkrans concours, jointly organized by the Concertgebouw Amsterdam and the Concertgebouw Orchestra.  In  2012 they organized the a four-day festival and competition Open Recorder Days Amsterdam, as well as a second festival in 2015.

Recorded music 
They record for Lindoro, including:
 Sweete Musicke of Sundrie Kindes (2015)
 En Er Mundo (2014)
 Angeli, Zingare & Patori (2013)
 A Noble Noyse of Musicke (2013)
 Del Canto Figurado (2012)
 The Flute-Heaven of the Gods (2009)
 Alla dolce ombra (2002)

References

Musical groups established in 1997
Early music groups
Dutch recorder players
Dutch musical groups